Ikrom Berdiev (born June 23, 1974) is an Uzbekistani boxer best known to win the gold medal at the 2002 Asian Games in  the light-heavyweight division.

Former middleweight world champion Utkirbek Haydarov who had won the middleweight title at the Asian Games moved up to light-heavy and competed for Uzbekistan at the 2004 Summer Olympics, therefore Berdiev didn't participate in Athens, Greece.

External links
 Asian Games - Pusan, South Korea - October 1-14th 2002
 Asian Championships - Seremban, Malaysia - June 19-25 2002
 

1974 births
Living people
Uzbekistani male boxers
Light-heavyweight boxers
Asian Games medalists in boxing
Asian Games gold medalists for Uzbekistan
Boxers at the 1994 Asian Games
Boxers at the 1998 Asian Games
Boxers at the 2002 Asian Games
Medalists at the 2002 Asian Games